The Journal of Manual & Manipulative Therapy is a peer-reviewed medical journal covering the field of orthopaedic manual therapy, including clinical research, therapeutic practice, and academic training. It is the official journal of the American Academy of Orthopaedic Manual Physical Therapists and has partnerships with the McKenzie Institute International and OMT-France. It was established in 1992 and is published by Taylor & Francis. The editor-in-chief is Jean-Michel Brismée, PT, ScD (Texas Tech University Health Sciences Center). He was preceded by Stanley Paris, John Medeiros, Peter Huijbregts, Chad Cook, and Dan Vaughn.

Abstracting and indexing
The journal is abstracted and indexed in:
EBSCO databases
CINAHL
Embase
Emerging Sources Citation Index
Index Medicus/MEDLINE/PubMed
Scopus

References

External links

Publications established in 1993
English-language journals
Taylor & Francis academic journals
Physical therapy journals
Bimonthly journals